Acton Vale is a district in London, England. It lies between Acton to the west, and Shepherd's Bush to the east.

In 1897, it referred to the stretch of the Uxbridge Road between Acton High Street (starting at the railway bridge) and Askew Road. In 1908, it referred to the stretch of the Uxbridge Road between Acton High Street (starting at the railway bridge) and Larden Road

References

Areas of London
Districts of the London Borough of Ealing
Acton, London